The Queensland's Q150 Icons list of cultural icons was compiled as part of Q150 celebrations in 2009 by the Government of Queensland, Australia. It represented the people, places and events that were significant to Queensland's first 150 years.

History
A list of 300 nominations for Queensland cultural icons was compiled by the Queensland Government, organised into 10 categories, and then the Queensland public were invited to vote to produce a final list of 150 icons. The final list was announced on 10 June 2009 by the Queensland Premier Anna Bligh, as part of the Q150 celebration of Queensland's foundation.

State shapers 
This list is for people and organisations that are significant to Queensland.

Influential artists

Sports legends

Locations

Natural attractions

Structures and engineering feats

Defining moments

Innovations and inventions

Events and festivals

Typically Queensland

References

External links 

 
Q150 Icons
Australian culture-related lists